Gozd may refer to the following places:
Gozd, Lublin Voivodeship (east Poland)
Gozd, West Pomeranian Voivodeship (northwest Poland)
Gozd, Ajdovščina, Slovenia
Gozd, Kamnik, Slovenia
Gozd, Tržič, Slovenia
Gozd Martuljek, Kranjska Gora, Slovenia (known as Gozd until 1955)

For other places in Poland, see Gózd (disambiguation).